The University of Zambia School of Public Health (UNZASPH), is one of the schools that comprise the University of Zambia College of Health Sciences.

Location
The campus of UZASPH is located at the Ridgeway Campus of the University, at the corner of Burma Road and Nationalist Road, in the city of Lusaka, the capital and largest city of Zambia. The geographical coordinates of the school are:15°26'15.0"S, 28°18'44.0"E (Latitude:-15.437500; Longitude:28.312222).

History
The origins of the UNZASPH date back to 1970s, when the Department of Public Health was established at University of Zambia School of Medicine. In July 2016, the university split the School of Medicine into four stand-alone schools, namely: (1) University of Zambia School of Medicine (2) University of Zambia School of Health Sciences (3) University of Zambia School of Nursing and (4) University of Zambia School of Public Health.

Departments
At inception, in July 2016, the school had the following departments: (1) Department of Environmental Health (2) Department of Epidemiology and Biostatistics (3) Department of Health Policy and Management (4) Department of Health Promotion and Population Studies. At that time, there were twenty-two full-time lecturers supported by visiting lecturers.

Collaboration
In 2002, Professor Knut Fylkesnes of the Centre for International Health, at Bergen University, who has been active in Zambia, since 1990s, established a working relationship with the University of Zambia. Under this arrangement, the University of Bergen offers training to qualified Zambians at Masters and Doctorate levels in Bergen, on condition that they return to Zambia after completing their education. As of October 2016, fifty-five Zambian nationals had been trained under this arrangement.

Undergraduate courses
 Bachelor of Science in Environmental Health.

Graduate courses
 Master of Public Health in Environmental Health
 Master of Public Health in Health Policy and Management
 Master of Public Health in Health Promotion
 Master of Public Health in Population Studies
 Master of Science in Epidemiology and Biostatistics

See also
 Education in Zambia
 University of Zambia
 University of Zambia School of Medicine

References

External links
Website of the University of Zambia
Choolwe Nkwemu Jacobs, BSN, MPH, PhD, Lecturer, University of Zambia, School of Public Health, Lusaka, Zambia

University of Zambia
Schools of public health
Lusaka
Educational institutions established in 2016
2016 establishments in Zambia